Padanna may refer to the following places in Kerala, India:

 Padne village near Cheruvathur, south of Thejaswini river, Kasaragod district
 Padannakkad village or Nileshwaram, north of Thejaswini river, Kasaragod district
 Padnekadappuram beach, part of Valiyaparamba beach in Kavvayi Backwaters